The 2004 World Junior Table Tennis Championships were held in Kobe, Japan, from 28 November to 5 December 2004. It was organised by the Japan Table Tennis Association under the auspices and authority of the International Table Tennis Federation (ITTF).

Medal summary

Events

Medal table

See also

2004 World Team Table Tennis Championships

References

World Junior Table Tennis Championships
World Junior Table Tennis Championships
World Junior Table Tennis Championships
World Junior Table Tennis Championships
Table tennis competitions in Japan
International sports competitions hosted by Japan
World Junior Table Tennis Championships
World Junior Table Tennis Championships